A public menorah is a large menorah displayed publicly during the Jewish holiday of Hanukkah. It is done to celebrate the holiday and publicize the miracle of Hanukkah, and is typically accompanied by a public event during one of the nights of Hanukkah attended by invited dignitaries who are honored with lighting the menorah.

Public menorah lighting were initiated by Rabbi Menachem M. Schneerson in 1974. The most prominent public menorah celebration takes place in Washington DC, and is known as the National Menorah. In 2013 Chabad planned 15,000 public menorah lighting events across the globe.

History

The concept of lighting a menorah in a way that allows the public to see it dates back to ancient times, where menorahs were lit outside of people's homes in order to publicize the miracle of Hanukkah. The concept of lighting a large menorah in public was initiated by Rabbi Menachem M. Schneerson (the Lubavitcher Rebbe) in 1973. He launched his Hanukkah-awareness campaign by encouraging his followers and emissaries to reach out to their fellow Jews and give them the opportunity to kindle the Hanukkah lights. That year they distributed some 60,000 tin menorahs. In 1974, Rabbi Abraham Shemtov kindled a menorah at the foot of the Liberty Bell at Independence Hall. The following year, in 1975, rock promoter Bill Graham sponsored Chabad's menorah in San Francisco. Since 1974, the concept of public menorahs expanded and in 1979, President Jimmy Carter participated in the lighting of a public menorah erected by Chabad. In 2014,  then-Vice President Joe Biden kindled a public menorah in Washington, D.C.

In 2013, Chabad planned 15,000 public menorah lighting events across the globe. Some believe the Hanukkah-awareness campaign has been a prime factor in the festival becoming so widely celebrated. But the initiative has also faced opposition from within the Jewish community, both from Conservative and Reform Jewish organizations, as well as from the Orthodox Union and Agudath Israel.

Notable public menorah lightings

United States

Since 1979, the National Menorah has been lit on the White House grounds in celebration of Hanukkah. President Jimmy Carter attended that first ceremony, and President Ronald Reagan designated it the National Menorah. In 2009 the ceremony included then-White House Chief of Staff Rahm Emanuel, followed by Chief of Staff Jack Lew in 2010 and 2011. In 2012, the first candle was lit with the help of Jeffrey Zients, director of the White House Office of Management and Budget.

A  structure, it is the work of Israeli artist Yaacov Agam. Because of the menorah's height, Con Edison assists the lighting by using a crane to lift each person to the top.

Canada
A large menorah is located at Toronto City Hall at the south east corner of Nathan Phillips Square during Hanukkah. as well as smaller one is also found at Old City Hall.

United Kingdom
Each year, the House of Commons of the United Kingdom holds a menorah lighting at the home of the Speaker of the House of Commons.  The menorah currently used was commissioned by the Rt. Hon. Michael J. Martin MP, former Speaker of the House of Commons.

Since 2007, Chabad has organized a public menorah celebration at Trafalgar Square. Each year the event is sponsored by Chabad, the Jewish Leadership Council, the London Jewish Forum and the mayor of London.

Israel

Public menorahs are prominently displayed throughout Israel, notably in the Ben Gurion airport.

Cyprus
Each year the Cypriot capital of Nicosia has lit a National Menorah in its city center.

Ukraine
On 18 December 2022, 10 months into the Russian invasion, and days after the most recent targeting of Ukraine's gas infrastructure,
the City of Kyiv lit what is claimed to be Europe's tallest Menora, (at 12-meters tall) in Maidan Nezalezhnosti square.

Controversy

The success of the public menorah campaign has not been without controversy. In 1988, the American Jewish Congress produced a 28-page report entitled "The Year of the Menorah", criticizing Chabad's public menorah campaign and the litigation that went with it.  It complained of the increase in the number of menorahs placed on public lands, arguing that it was causing tension both within the community and with non-Jews. In 1989, the ACLU challenged the legality of a display of a Chabad-owned public menorah in County of Allegheny. In a court case County of Allegheny v. ACLU the United States Supreme Court ruled in favor of the menorah.

In 1989, the city of Burlington, Vermont denied the local Chabad chapter, headed by Rabbi Yitzchok Raskin permission to erect a menorah in the city's main park during Hanukkah. Raskin appealed the decision on two occasions after an initial hearing 1987 found the display to be unconstitutional under the Establishment Clause of the First Amendment. The ACLU assisted the City of Burlington in a final appeal in the United States Court of Appeals for the Second Circuit in 1991, and the menorah ban was upheld. There have been similar cases involving Chabad public menorahs with the courts ruling against Chabad, including Chicago (1990) Iowa (1986), Cincinnati (1991), and Georgia (1991). In addition, in 1991, in White Plains, New York, the Common Council unanimously rejected the display of a Chabad menorah in a public space in the town with the support of many Jews, affirming a local tradition of keeping parks free of religious and political displays.

On the other hand, in 2002, the U.S. Supreme Court allowed Rabbi Sholom B. Kalmanson of Chabad of Southern Ohio to light an  menorah in Cincinnati's Fountain Square. Justice John Paul Stevens upheld a lower court ruling that the city could not ban the menorah and other religious displays from the square.

Due to the menorah being a Jewish symbol, menorahs in public have been subject to anti-Semitic violence. For instance, in 2009 in Moldova, a group of fundamentalist Orthodox Christians took down a public menorah and replaced it with a cross. The same year, in Vienna, Austria, a Chabad rabbi was attacked by a Muslim man while leading the candle lighting ceremony.

Controversy has also arisen at the Western Wall in Israel. For Hanukkah every year a giant menorah is erected in the men's section of the Western Wall and each night of the eight nights of the festival, male rabbis and male politicians are honored, while women are kept at a distance, where they are barely able to see the ceremony. Women of the Wall sent a letter to Prime Minister Benjamin Netanyahu requesting a large menorah also be erected in the women's section, but Netanyahu simply forwarded the letter to Western Wall rabbi Shmuel Rabinowitz, who accused WoW of ulterior motives of trying to change the customs at the Wall. Responding to Rabinowitz' accusation, Anat Hoffman noted: "In his letter, Rabbi Rabinowitz speaks of bringing together and uniting the nation, and yet his actions exclude and discriminate against women as if women are not part of the same nation. Since he was chosen for this public position, Rabinowitz has never invited Women of the Wall or any other women to participate in the ceremonies or to be honored with the lighting of a candle at the Kotel on Hanukkah, despite the fact that women are obligated equally to men in this religious act." In December 2014 the personal menorahs the women brought to the Kotel were confiscated, but they were returned when police were called.

References

External links 

 Public Menorahs Around the Globe
 Public Menorahs from menorah.net
 The World's Largest Menorah

Hanukkah
Chabad outreach
Menachem Mendel Schneerson
Establishment Clause case law
Chabad-Lubavitch (Hasidic dynasty)
Chabad-Lubavitch related controversies
Menorah